

This is a list of the National Register of Historic Places listings in Douglas County, Colorado.

This is intended to be a complete list of the properties and districts on the National Register of Historic Places in Douglas County, Colorado, United States. The locations of National Register properties and districts for which the latitude and longitude coordinates are included below, may be seen in a map.

There are 29 properties and districts listed on the National Register in the county.  Another property was once listed but has been removed.

Current listings

|}

Former listing

|}

See also

 List of National Historic Landmarks in Colorado
 National Register of Historic Places listings in Colorado

References

Douglas
Douglas County, Colorado